Uludere District is a district of the Şırnak Province of Turkey. In 2021, the district had a population of 44,924. The seat of the district is the town of Uludere.

The district was formed in 1957.

Population 
Around 90% of the district is populated by Kurds from the Goyan tribe. The Kaşuran tribe also reside in the district.

Settlements 
Uludere District contains three beldes, sixteen villages of which two are unpopulated and moreover seven hamlets.

Beldes 

 Hilal
 Şenoba
 Uzungeçit

Villages 

 Akduman
 Andaç
 Bağlı
 Bağlıca
 Ballı
 Dağdibi
 Doğan
 Gülyazı
 Işıkveren
 İnceler
 Onbudak ()
 Ortabağ
 Ortaköy
 Ortasu
 Taşdelen
 Yemişli

Geography 
Uludere's total land area is 825 km². Its neighbors are: the district of Çukurca in the province of Hakkâri to the east; the districts of Şırnak and Silopi to the west; the district of Beytüşşebap to the north; and the country of Iraq to the south.

The topography of Uludere consists mostly of rugged mountainous terrain. The Haftanîn and Kêla Meme (Kel Mehmet) mountains are the highest mountains in Uludere. In addition, Suwar, Serhe, Haftanîn, Meydan, Elcan and Şirîş are important plateaus. The altitude varies between 800 meters and 3200 meters throughout the district. The lowest altitude is in the Şenoba town and the highest altitude is in the Kel Mehmet (Kêla Meme) mountain.

References 

Districts of Şırnak Province
States and territories established in 1957